Creedence Clearwater Couto (born March 6, 1979), commonly known as Paulista, is a Brazilian association footballer who played as a striker for Santa Cruz in the Brazilian state of Rio Grande do Sul.

A journeyman, he has spent the majority of his career in the lower reaches of Brazilian football apart from one loan spell at Lierse of Belgium's Pro League in 2005.  He also had an unsuccessful trial at Stabæk of Norway in 2006.

Name
He is perhaps best known for his unusual name, which has featured in many articles on extravagant sporting birth names. His parents were big fans of the American rock band Creedence Clearwater Revival and decided to adopt this name for their son.

References

1979 births
Living people
Brazilian footballers
Guarani FC players
Figueirense FC players
Lierse S.K. players
Association football forwards
Footballers from São Paulo (state)